Khlong Bangkok Noi (lit 'Small Bangkok Canal') is a khlong (คลอง; canal) in Bangkok; its name is the origin of the name Bangkok Noi District. The mouth of Khlong Bangkok Noi is located beside Siriraj Piyamaharajkarun Hospital (SiPH) and the former Bangkok Noi railway station (now the location of Thonburi Railway Station Pier). The current flows north through many historical and cultural landmarks, such as  Ansorissunnah Royal Mosque, National Museum of Royal Barges, Wat Suwannaram, Thon Buri railway station, Wat Amarintharam, and Wat Si Sudaram, a Thai temple known as the place where the poet Sunthorn Phu studied in his childhood, as well as Wat Bang Oi Chang in Nonthaburi Province, etc. The canal terminates at the confluence with Khlong Om Non and Khlong Bang Yai at the Old Bang Yai Market in Bang Yai District, Nonthaburi Province, along the way, it is also connected to many canals, such as Khlong Chak Phra, Khlong Maha Sawat, Khlong Bang Kruai.

For this reason it has been promoted as one of the cultural tourism routes, as well as other canals in Bangkok and the vicinity.

History 
The canal, along with its counterpart Khlong Bangkok Yai, was initially a meandering part of the Chao Praya River's original course. In 1552, during the reign of King Chairachathirat of the Ayutthaya Kingdom, he ordered the construction of a canal bypassing the meander to shorten travel time, known as Khlong Lat Bangkok (คลองลัดบางกอก; 'Bangkok Short-Cut Canal'). As time passed, the new canal was eroded and became gradually wider. Eventually, the river diverted through the new canal, and its old course became the two canals known today as Khlong Bangkok Yai and Khlong Bangkok Noi.

In the early-Rattanakosin period, there was a floating market where vendor's boats and wooden houseboats mingled, lining up along the waterways to Bang Bamru and Bang Khun Non. This scenery was recounted in at least two poems by Sunthorn Phu (1786–1855), a poet of that era, who was born in Bangkok Noi.

References

 Canals in Thailand
Bangkok Noi district
History of Bangkok
Tourist attractions in Bangkok
Canals opened in 1522
1522 establishments in Asia
Chao Phraya River